A 4 App is a live album by American recording artist Anastacia. It has been released on December 16, 2016 through the PledgeMusic website by Sony Music. The album features a collection of non-album singles, B-Sides and unreleased tracks that were performed live during the Ultimate Collection Tour in 2016.

As part of the tour, Anastacia wanted her fans to choose which songs they'd like to hear (besides tracks already featured on the Ultimate Collection). The Anastacia App allowed her fans to vote for a particular song 24 hours prior to each concert. The most popular song each night was then added to the setlist and recorded for the album.

Background
In September 2016, it was announced on PledgeMusic website that a new album would be released and that the fans could pre-order it in a signed version. 2 weeks later (October 31), the singer announced that the album would in fact be a live album with the tracks the fans voted on the Anastacia App.
On a Facebook Live Q&A, the singer also said the album cover would be designed by a fan.

Track listing

Release history

References

2016 live albums
Anastacia albums